Sheila Crump Johnson (born January 25, 1949) is an American businesswoman, co-founder of BET, CEO of Salamander Hotels and Resorts, and the first billionaire African-American woman.

Johnson is team president, managing partner, and governor of the WNBA's Washington Mystics, a position she earned before the 2005 season. On May 24, 2005, Washington Sports and Entertainment Chairman, Abe Pollin, sold the Mystics to Lincoln Holdings LLC, where Johnson served as president. She is the first African-American woman to be an owner or partner in three professional sports franchises: the Washington Capitals (NHL), the Washington Wizards (NBA), and the Washington Mystics (WNBA). Johnson is CEO of Salamander Hospitality, a company she founded in 2005.

Early life
Sheila Johnson was born on January 25, 1949 in McKeesport, Pennsylvania, the daughter of a neurosurgeon father who worked for the Veterans Administration, and an accountant mother.

While attending Proviso East High School in Maywood, Illinois she was a cheerleader, serving as captain of the varsity squad in her senior year.  She was also educated at the University of Illinois.

Philanthropy 
Johnson is a Global Ambassador for CARE, a humanitarian organization fighting global poverty.  Sheila's I Am Powerful Challenge raised over $8 million in 2007. She serves as Chair of the Board of Governors of Parsons The New School for Design in New York and funded the opening of the Sheila C. Johnson Design Center, combining classrooms, public program spaces and galleries.  She sits on the boards of VH1's Save the Music Foundation, Americans for the Arts, the Curry School of Education Foundation at the University of Virginia, and the University of Illinois Foundation.  Johnson is also the Ambassador for the Healthy Site Institute, a member of the Council on Foreign Relations, and a member of Sigma Alpha Iota music fraternity.

Film 
Johnson's first film, Kicking It, premiered at the 2008 Sundance Film Festival in Park City, UT.  She served as sole executive producer on her second film, A Powerful Noise, which premiered at the 2008 Tribeca Film Festival in New York.

Personal life 
For 33 years from 1969–2002, she was married to Robert L. Johnson.  Together they founded the entertainment network BET.  They sold the company to Viacom in 1999. They have two children.

In an interview, Sheila Johnson said she herself is "ashamed" of what the BET has become. "I don't watch it. I suggest to my kids that they don't watch it," she said. "When we started BET, it was going to be the Ebony magazine on television. We had public affairs programming. We had news... I had a show called Teen Summit, we had a large variety of programming, but the problem is that then the video revolution started up... And then something started happening, and I didn't like it at all. And I remember during those days we would sit up and watch these videos and decide which ones were going on and which ones were not. We got a lot of backlash from recording artists... and we had to start showing them. I didn't like the way women were being portrayed in these videos."

After her divorce from Robert L. Johnson in 2002, she was estimated to be worth about $670 million.  In 2009, Forbes magazine estimated her net worth to be $400 million. In May 2017, Johnson's net worth was placed at $750 million.

On September 24, 2005, she married Arlington County Circuit Court Chief Judge William T. Newman, who had presided over her divorce from Robert L. Johnson in 2003.  The couple first met three decades earlier when they acted in a play together.

In 2007 Johnson was honored as one of the Library of Virginia's "Virginia Women in History" for her career and her contributions to society.

Johnson is a Democrat, although in 2009 she endorsed Republican Virginia gubernatorial candidate Bob McDonnell.
In early October 2009, Johnson mocked the stutter of Democratic gubernatorial candidate Creigh Deeds at a rally for McDonnell's campaign. She later apologized.

In April 2010, Johnson condemned Virginia Governor Bob McDonnell for his proclamation honoring Confederate History Month because it omitted any reference to slavery.

In April 2021, Johnson along with Washington Commanders team president Jason Wright formed the Inclusive Growth Strategy Council within the Greater Washington Partnership.

Awards 
Recognized as a Eleanor Roosevelt Val-Kill Medalist in 2012, Johnson was honored as an individual whose far-reaching influence has made our world a better place. In 2018, Johnson received the Lincoln Medal which is given by Ford’s Theatre Society to those who, through their body of work, accomplishments or personal attributes, exemplify the lasting legacy and mettle of character embodied by Abraham Lincoln. In May 2019, The Lincoln Academy of Illinois granted Johnson the Order of Lincoln award, the highest honor bestowed by the State of Illinois. In October 2019, the Women's Sports Foundation honored Johnson with the Billie Jean King Leadership Award.

References

External links
 Johnson's biography at the Library of Virginia
 Designer Luxury Silk Scarves, Wearable Art by Sheila Johnson

1949 births
African-American sports executives and administrators
African-American businesspeople
African-American women in business
American sports executives and administrators
African-American billionaires
African-American investors
American women in business
Businesspeople from Virginia
Living people
People from Loudoun County, Virginia
Washington Mystics executives
Washington Mystics owners
Washington Capitals owners
Washington Wizards owners
Women's National Basketball Association executives
American billionaires
Female billionaires
Women in American professional sports management
Sigma Alpha Iota
Women basketball executives
People from The Plains, Virginia
Virginia Democrats
21st-century African-American people
21st-century African-American women
20th-century African-American sportspeople
20th-century African-American women
20th-century African-American people